Transwede Airways AB was a charter airline based at Göteborg Landvetter Airport in Landvetter, Härryda Municipality, near Gothenburg. Transwede operated flights on wet lease agreements from London City Airport, as well as charter flights. The company was owned by Braathens Aviation. Transwede Airways had appointed a new CEO, Trygve Gjertsen, who started January 1, 2007, taking over Jimmie Bergqvist.

The inaugural flight from Stockholm-Arlanda Airport to London City Airport, numbered SK517, took place on February 13, 2006, under Scandinavian Airlines colors. This has given place to two daily flights, numbered SK517/518 and SK529/530, with the new Transwede livery, which is a variation of Malmö's.

As per 31 March 2010 the airline has decided that all activities in the company will end as Transwede has not been operating during 2010.

Destinations

On behalf of Alitalia
  Italy
Milan (Linate Airport)
  United Kingdom
London (London City Airport)

Fleet
The Transwede Airways fleet consisted of the following aircraft (as of March 2008):

4 Avro RJ70 one aircraft was operated for Scandinavian Airlines Sweden, two aircraft are operated for SAS Norge and one aircraft is operated for Air One).
2 Avro RJ85 were operated for Scandinavian Airlines Sweden.

References

External links

Transwede Airways
Transwede Airways Fleet

Defunct airlines of Sweden
Airlines established in 2005
Airlines disestablished in 2010
Swedish companies established in 2005
Swedish companies disestablished in 2010